Nicholas Pickard (born 27 May 1975) is an English actor. He is known for his portrayal of Tony Hutchinson in the Channel 4 soap opera Hollyoaks, a role he has held since its first episode in 1995; he remains the longest-serving cast member.

Early life 
Nicholas Pickard was born on 27 May 1975 in Surrey. He studied at the Sylvia Young Theatre School and Corona Theatre School worked extensively in the theatre before joining Hollyoaks. His young brother, John, was also educated at the earlier school; John went on to join Hollyoaks in 2005, 10 years after Pickard did. When Pickard joined Hollyoaks, he relocated to Liverpool, where the programme is filmed.

Career 
In his acting debut, Pickard played Mio, the lead role in Mio in the Land of Faraway (1987), starring alongside a young Christian Bale, where he was credited as Nicholas Pickard. In 1993, Pickard played a minor role in EastEnders, appearing as a young homeless boy. In addition, Pickard has appeared in other television programmes, including Us Girls and If You Were Me. He appeared in music videos for "Over My Shoulder" (for Mike + The Mechanics) and "Almost Unreal" (for Roxette).

He landed the role of Tony Hutchinson in Hollyoaks in 1995, becoming a member of the original cast. He remains in the role to date, and has since become the longest-serving cast member, having played the part since the inaugural episode. Over the years, Pickard has been nominated for a number of awards independently and some nominations with colleagues. In 2017, Pickard won the British Soap Award for Outstanding Achievement in honour of his achievement of playing the role for 22 years.

In 2005, Pickard's brother John joined the cast of Hollyoaks, portraying the role of Dominic Reilly, the half-brother of Tony. When John left the programme in 2010, The Daily Star released a news article claiming that Pickard was set to follow in his brother's footsteps and depart Hollyoaks, stating that he was "disgusted" with his brother's "axing". However, Pickard denied these reports, confirming that he was happy and had no intentions to leave the soap. Pickard has appeared in theatre productions including Richard II, An Enemy of the People and Edward II. He also joined the cast of the 2009 pantomime adaption of Cinderella at Liverpool Empire Theatre, where he portrayed Dandini. His break from Hollyoaks to perform in Cinderella was planned and written into the show.

In 2011, Pickard participated in the sixth series of Celebrity MasterChef, where he reached the final though lost out to Phil Vickery. In 2016, he once again participated in a game show, appearing in an episode of Pointless Celebrities, playing the game in a partnership with his Hollyoaks colleague Alex Fletcher.

Personal life 

Pickard is the owner of several restaurants in Sheffield. He has a daughter named Ellie. Pickard was in a relationship with his former Hollyoaks colleague Joanna Taylor, who portrayed the role of Geri Hudson. He is a dedicated Chelsea Football Club fan.

Filmography

Awards and nominations

References

External links 

 

English male soap opera actors
1975 births
Living people
Male actors from Surrey
Alumni of the Sylvia Young Theatre School